Fear and Sand is a 1948 Italian comedy film directed by Mario Mattoli and starring Totò.

Plot
Nicolino is a kitchen boy who works in a small pharmacy in the country, run by a woman unbearably rude. So Nicolino really wants to leave his job, when he discovers that you are looking for a murderess with the same face to his. Nicolino so disguises himself as a woman and flees with the first plane is: leave for Sevilla. In Spain Nicolino is always found involved in misunderstandings and terrible mess because it is always considered a murderess until he runs into some people who mistake him for a famous bullfighter ready for his next battle against the bull to be held in bullfight in a few rounds. Nicolino in spite of being trained and prepared for the race and also falls in love with the beautiful Patricia, who encourages him to fight. Nicolino is wittily nicknamed "Nicolete" and is faced with the bull but it breaks down. In the hospital Nicolete prove their identity and will marry Patricia.

Cast
 Totò as Nicolino Capece
 Isa Barzizza as Patricia Cotten
 Mario Castellani as Cast
 Franca Marzi as Carmen
 Giulio Marchetti as Paquito
 Cesare Polacco as Banderillero
 Vinicio Sofia as Paquito's manager
 Ada Dondini as Mrs. Adele
 Luigi Pavese as Doctor
 Galeazzo Benti as George
 Raimondo Vianello as Maître
 Alda Mangini as Lady on train
 Ughetto Bertucci as Chauffeur
 Enzo Turco as Shoeshiner's customer

References

Bibliography
 Brunetta, Gian Piero. The History of Italian Cinema: A Guide to Italian Film from Its Origins to the Twenty-first Century.  Princeton University Press, 2009.

External links

1948 films
1948 comedy films
Italian comedy films
1940s Italian-language films
Italian black-and-white films
Films directed by Mario Mattoli
Films set in Seville
1940s Italian films